George Daniel Clark (30 July 1848 – 21 February 1933) was an Australian politician.

Born in Colchester, Essex, to Daniel and Mary Ann Clark, he received limited schooling and worked on ships, which eventually took him to Australia around 1871, where he found employment with the Australasian Steam Navigation Company. On 27 August 1875 he married Rosannah Jane Druce at Woolloomooloo, with whom he had five children. He subsequently moved to Sydney and became a messenger at the Sydney Observatory. Having joined the International Order of Good Templars around 1873, he edited the New South Wales Good Templar (renamed Australian Temperance World in 1896) from 1883 to 1917; he was also a foundation member of the New South Wales Institute of Journalist. In 1891 he was elected to the New South Wales Legislative Assembly as one of four members for Balmain; he was elected for the Labor Party but refused to sign the pledge, subsequently joining the Free Traders. In 1894 Balmain was split into Balmain North, Balmain South, Annandale and Leichhardt, each electing one member. Clark contested Leichardt as the Free Trade Candidate, but was unsuccessful. After his defeat he rejoined the Labor Party and ran as a with its endorsement in four state elections between 1898 and 1907, without success. He was also a Labor candidate at the 1906 Australian Senate election for NSW.

See also

References

 

1848 births
1933 deaths
Free Trade Party politicians
Members of the New South Wales Legislative Assembly
English emigrants to Australia
People from Colchester
Politicians from Sydney
Australian sailors
Australian Labor Party members of the Parliament of New South Wales